Kent Brewster (born 1961) is a writer, editor, and publisher. He was the publisher and frequent editor of the Hugo Award-nominated Speculations, a magazine of science fiction and other speculative fiction, from its inception in 1994 until it ceased operating in 2008.

Brewster's short story, "“In the Pound, Near Breaktime," was a finalist for the 1996 Nebula Award for Best Short Story.

Brewster was born in the UK but lives and works in Silicon Valley, as an engineer for Pinterest. His web-based prototypes and demonstrations include Badge Any Feed with Pipes, Blog Juice and Netflix Widgets.

References

External links
 Kent’s home page.
 Blog Juice
 Badge Any Feed with Pipes
 In the Pound, Near Breaktime
 Return of Netflix Widgets
 SpiffY!Search
 Kent Brewster at Free Speculative Fiction Online

American science fiction writers
American short story writers
1961 births
Living people
Science fiction editors
American male short story writers
American male novelists
American speculative fiction editors
American speculative fiction publishers (people)